Kukola is a district and a suburb of the city of Turku, in Finland. It is located in the central part of the island of Hirvensalo, off the city's coastline. The largest school in Hirvensalo is located in Kukola, as well as the island's only library.

The current population of Kukola is 1,486, and it is increasing at an annual rate of 1.95%. 36.61% of the district's population are under 15 years old, while 2.89% are over 65. The district's linguistic makeup is 93.27% Finnish, 4.71% Swedish, and 2.02% other.

See also
 Districts of Turku
 Districts of Turku by population
 Districts of Haameli
 Districts of Ponttola
 Districts of Plurt

Districts of Turku